Chah Shurak (also Romanized as Chāh Shūrak; also known as Chāh-e Sūrak) is a village in Asir Rural District, Asir District, Mohr County, Fars Province, Iran. At the 2006 census, its population was 216, in 32 families.

References 

Populated places in Mohr County